Brigadier Berenger Colborne Bradford  (15 October 1912 – 4 March 1996), known as Bill Bradford, was a British Army officer who served in the Black Watch from 1932 to 1959.

References

1912 births
1996 deaths
British Army brigadiers
British Army personnel of World War II
Members of the Order of the British Empire
Recipients of the Military Cross
Companions of the Distinguished Service Order
Graduates of the Royal Military College, Sandhurst
People educated at Eton College
Members of the Royal Company of Archers
Black Watch officers
Burials in Scotland
Military personnel from London